Ptychobarbus kaznakovi is a species of cyprinid fish endemic to Tibet.

Footnotes 

Freshwater fish of China
Cyprinid fish of Asia
Fish described in 1903
Taxa named by Alexander Nikolsky